The University of Wisconsin Colleges Online is an online college program which is part of the University of Wisconsin Colleges, the freshman-sophomore campuses of the University of Wisconsin System.

University of Wisconsin Colleges Online allows students to earn an Associate of Arts and Science Degree (AAS) completely online. Students enrolled at a University of Wisconsin four-year campus may also take courses through the UW Colleges Online to supplement their university course load. Credits earned in this fashion are transferred to their home campus. Students may also use financial aid from their home campus.

UW Colleges Online is fully accredited by the Higher Learning Commission, a Commission of the North Central Association of Colleges and Schools. UW Colleges Online adheres to the Guidelines for Distance Education espoused by the North Central Association (NCA) Commission on Institutions of Higher Education.

UW Colleges Online uses Desire2Learn as its course management system (CMS). Courses are offered during three terms: Spring, Summer, and Fall. There are currently no self-paced course offerings available.

References

External links
UW Colleges Online website

University of Wisconsin System
Education in Madison, Wisconsin